Anita J. Prazmowska (also Prażmowska) is a Professor in International History at the London School of Economics, England. Her main fields of research lie in the Cold War, communism, contemporary history, Eastern Europe, fascism and Poland. She has published several books and journals. Her articles have been published in The Guardian.  Her biography of Władysław Gomułka was released in 2016.

Selected publications

Władysław Gomułka: A Biography (I.B. Tauris, 2016).
A History of Poland 2nd ed. (Palgrave Macmillan, 2011).
Poland: A Modern History (I.B. Tauris, 2010).
Ignacy Paderewski: Poland (Haus Publishing, 2009).
Civil War in Poland 1942–1948 (Palgrave Macmillan, 2004).
Eastern Europe and the Origins of the Second World War (Palgrave Macmillan, 2000).
Britain and Poland 1939–1943: The Betrayed Ally (Cambridge University Press, 1995).
Britain, Poland and the Eastern Front, 1939 (Cambridge University Press, 1987).

References

External links
Biography at LSE
Publications at LSE

Academics of the London School of Economics
British people of Polish descent
Living people
Year of birth missing (living people)